The white-edged moray (Gymnothorax verrilli) is a moray eel found in the eastern central Pacific Ocean, from Panama to Baja California. It lives on shallow-water sandy and muddy bottoms, and can grow to  length.

References

verrilli
Fish described in 1883
Taxa named by David Starr Jordan